Angola competed at the 2019 World Aquatics Championships in Gwangju, South Korea from 12 to 28 July.

Open water swimming

Angola qualified one male open water swimmer.

Swimming

Angolan swimmers have achieved qualifying standards in the following events (up to a maximum of 2 swimmers in each event at the A-standard entry time, and 1 at the B-standard)

Men

Women

Mixed

References

World Aquatics Championships
2019
Nations at the 2019 World Aquatics Championships